Snatcher may refer to:

Snatcher, a criminal who engages in snatch theft
Snatcher (video game), a 1988 graphic adventure game
Snatcher Wes (Leo in Japanese), a character in the 2003 video game Pokémon Colosseum
Snatcher, a character in the 2017 video game A Hat in Time
The Snatcher, a 2014 teen novel by Anthony McGowan
Snatchers, an organization within the Death Eaters in the Harry Potter books
Snatchers, a 2019 comedy horror film
Snatcher, a character in A Hat in Time

See also

Snatch (disambiguation)
Snatched (disambiguation)